The North East Land, Sea and Air Museums (NELSAM), formerly the North East Aircraft Museum, is a volunteer-run aviation museum situated on the site of the former RAF Usworth/Sunderland Airport, between Washington and Sunderland, in Tyne and Wear, England. The museum has the largest aviation collection between Yorkshire and Scotland and houses over 30 aircraft and a wide collection of aero engines. The museum also has a small collection of other items such as weaponry, vehicles and other historical exhibits.

The museum also has special displays showing a replica of a Second World War British street and one honouring No. 607 Squadron RAF, which was based at RAF Usworth.

NELSAM is an English registered charity.

History
The North East Land, Sea and Air Museums traces its origins back to the formation of the North East Vintage and Veteran Aircraft Association (NEAVVAA), which started meeting in March 1974 at the Sunderland Airport, which had been RAF Usworth. In March 1975 the group purchased a Westland WS-51 Dragonfly helicopter from a scrapyard and this became its first aircraft. The group continued to accumulate aircraft and in May 1977 changed its name to the Northumbian Aeronautical Collection. In 1979 the name was changed again, to North East Aircraft Museum. More aircraft were added, including an Avro Vulcan in January 1983.

In April 1984 the local government, Sunderland Council announced that the airport would be closed to make way for an automobile manufacturing plant. After protracted negotiations the museum was given a lease on a four-acre site just outside the airfield. In 1987 the museum was opened to the public on a full-time basis. In 1989 the museum started to fund raise to construct buildings to house at last some of the collection indoors and in 1991 planning authority was granted for a new hangar to be built, actual construction of which was started in 1993.

The museum used the old Sunderland Airport control tower for storage and administrative use and it was burnt in an arsonist attack in September 1996. On 23 January 1997, arsonists destroyed the museum's Vickers Valetta C2 (VX577), which was one of only three Valettas in existence. The Valletta's restoration work had taken two years and was completed the previous summer.

A military vehicle collection previously displayed in Newcastle upon Tyne began relocation to the museum's new large Romney hut in early 2012. This addition  resulted in the name change of the facility to its present name, North East Land, Sea and Air Museums.

The North Eastern Electrical Traction Trust (NEETT) moved trams and buses to a new tram shed on the site in April 2013. It was completed and track installed in December 2013.

Collection

The museum's collection includes:

Aircraft

Aero Engines

Buses, transport and trains

Military vehicles and equipment

See also
List of aerospace museums
List of museums in Tyne and Wear
List of transport museums

References

External links 

Museums in the City of Sunderland
Aerospace museums in England
Charities based in England